Ali Hussain Yousif Al-Mazam (Arabic:علي حسين) (born 21 October 1985) is an Emirati footballer. He currently plays .

External links

References

Emirati footballers
1985 births
Living people
Al Ahli Club (Dubai) players
Al-Nasr SC (Dubai) players
Khor Fakkan Sports Club players
Place of birth missing (living people)
Footballers at the 2006 Asian Games
UAE Pro League players
Association football midfielders
Asian Games competitors for the United Arab Emirates